UMSL North is a St. Louis MetroLink station. This station serves the North Campus of the University of Missouri-St. Louis including the Touhill Performing Arts Center, the Millennium Student Center, and the Recreation and Wellness Center.

In the future, vacant land just to the north of the station could become home to a North St. Louis County recreation and athletics facility that would take advantage of a location near public transit and Interstate 70.

Station layout
The station is located on an embankment between two elevated viaducts, just east of a tunnel. It is accessed via sidewalks from UMSL's Parking Lot F.

References

External links
 St. Louis Metro

MetroLink stations in St. Louis County, Missouri
Red Line (St. Louis MetroLink)
Railway stations in the United States opened in 1993
Railway stations in Missouri at university and college campuses
1993 establishments in Missouri